Bolma kiharai is a species of sea snail, a marine gastropod mollusk in the family Turbinidae, the turban snails.

Description
The height of the shell attains 14.5 mm.

Distribution
This marine species occurs off Japan.

References

External links
 To World Register of Marine Species

kiharai
Gastropods described in 1986
Molluscs described in 1986